Standing Indian Mountain, elevation , is part of the North Carolina portion of the Southern Nantahala Wilderness within the boundaries of the Nantahala National Forest.  The mountain lies along the Appalachian Trail and is the highest point along the Nantahala River.

Name
The Cherokee name for Standing Indian Mountain is Yunwitsule-nunyi, which translates to "where the man stood." According to Cherokee mythology, Standing Indian Mountain is home to the remains of a Cherokee warrior. This warrior had been sent to the mountaintop to keep a lookout for a winged monster. The monster, whose lair was located on Standing Indian Mountain, would swoop in from the skies and steal children. Upon discovering the location of the monster's lair, the Cherokee prayed to the Great Spirit for assistance. The prayers were answered when the Great Spirit destroyed the monster and its lair with thunder and lightning. The lightning frightened the warrior and the warrior tried to abandon his post. Because the warrior abandoned his post, he was turned into stone for his cowardice.

Geography
Standing Indian Mountain is located inside the Southern Nantahala Wilderness.

Hiking
The Appalachian Trail passes over Standing Indian Mountain's summit. From the Deep Gap parking area, it is a  hike up the Appalachian Trail to the summit.

See also
List of mountains in North Carolina

References

Further reading

Protected areas of Clay County, North Carolina
Protected areas of Macon County, North Carolina
Mountains of North Carolina
Nantahala National Forest
Landforms of Clay County, North Carolina
Landforms of Macon County, North Carolina
Religious places of the indigenous peoples of North America